Pentavryso, known before 1927 as Kotlari, is a village located 6 km northeast of Ptolemaida, in northern Kozani regional unit, within the Greek region of Macedonia. It is situated at an altitude of 600 meters. The postal code is 50200, while the telephone code is +30 24630. At the 2011 census the population was 224.

References

Populated places in Kozani (regional unit)